Teresa Trujillo is a Uruguayan dancer, actor, choreographer, performing arts specialist and political activist. She has created dance and other performances in South America, Europe, and the United States.

Biography 
Trujillo was born on April 4, 1937 in the Pocitos barrio of Montevideo, Uruguay7.  Trujillo began dancing at an early age. She studied ballet under Tamara Grigorieva until joining the Elsa Vallarino dance group. Trujillo also studied music at the Kolischer Conservatory.

In 1962, Trujillo moved to New York to study modern dance from Martha Graham and Jose Limon. In 1964, she completed her academic training at the Schola Cantorum in Paris. Trujillo then joined the Karin Waehner company, and began choreographing dances. she began experimenting with  music, dance, and painting to create a multidisciplinary act.

By 1966, Trujillo was back in Uruguay. During this period, he found her work censored by the government of Jorge Pacheco Areco, which did not appreciate modern dance. In 1972, Trujillo left the country, spending time in Argentina, Chile, Cuba, Venezuela and Spain. In 1985, after the end of the military dictatorship, she returned to Uruguay.

In the 1990s, Trujillo switched from dance to theatre work, teaching at University of Music . She received up a degree from the Eutonia of Buenos Aires, where she would later teach.

Activism 
In the 1960s Trujillo, Graciela Figueroa, Isabel Gilbert and curator Angela Lopez Ruiz created a piece titled Gender and Dance Studies in Pioneers of Action Art I. It aimed to show the experiences of Uruguayan women by using their testimonies and archives.

Moreover, Trujillo's activism extends to the evolution of dance and freedom of expression, something that was heavily censored in Uruguay due to the dictatorship. In an interview with Laura Sand of Voyart, Trujillo explains that freedom was the biggest motivator of dance, and that her body is dance, indicating the liberating nature she achieves from dance.

Artwork

Dance

Escalada, 1969
A 35-minute dance piece regarding the construction of a new building, Alliance Francaise De Montevideo, in Uruguay. The set was a structure of metallic tubes in the center of the future theatre. .

Choreography

Danztrio 
Dance group who performed on Caleidoscopio. This group was created as a result of the dynamic lifestyle found in Spain, which made it very difficult for dancers like Trujillo to struggled to situate themselves.

Kaspar 
In 1986, Trujillo worked on the national comedy of Kaspar.

Waiting for Godot
Trujillo participated in this version of Waiting for Godot, in which the actors are women. She starred with Susana Castro, Nelly Goitino, and Norma Salvo and given one of her first monologues. Trujillo was short listed for the Revelation Prize.

Select works

Uruguay 1954-1961 
Autumn is in the Air
 Dalica

Paris 1964-1965 
The Beginning
 Kinesis
 Improvisation II
 Ephemeral Panic
 Eryximaque

Uruguay 1966-1967 
 Happening
 Balance
 Embryo

Uruguay 1969-1970 
6-breakup-9
 Climbing
 What to do with dance in these moving times

Exile 1972-1984

Cuba 1972-1978 
Uruguay today
Venezuela 1974-1978
Spain 1978-1986
DanzTri
Caleidoscopio

Uruguay 1984-1989 
Round and round
 Get out if you can
 Body to body
 Waiting for Godot
 Kaspar
 Body stories

Uruguay 1994-2016 
Broth to the Queen
 The Volatinero
 Sanchez, the splendor 900
 Art ≠ Life
 Pioneers of Art in Action
 Body, place of memory
 Radical Women Latin American Art

Los Angeles 2017-2018 
Radical Women Catalog Page 207-299 to 300-352

Exhibits 
1960–1985, Radical Women: Latin American Art ( Los Angeles, New York, San Pablo)

Awards
2013 - Morosoli Award in the Performing Arts category - Dance and Ballet.

Publications 
In September 2012, Trujillo and artist Carina Gobbi published Cuerpo a Cuerpo (Body to Body), a biographical book.

References

External links
 

1937 births
Uruguayan dancers
Living people